Brown Sugar is the fourth album by American organist Freddie Roach recorded in 1964 and released on the Blue Note label.

Reception

The Allmusic review by Stephen Thomas Erlewine awarded the album 4½ stars and stated "Brown Sugar marks a turning point for Freddie Roach: It's the moment he decided to get dirty, funky, and soulful. Previously, he had plenty of funk in his playing, but he was tasteful, at times a little bit too tasteful. On Brown Sugar, he simply burns".

Track listing
All compositions by Freddie Roach except as noted
 "Brown Sugar" - 4:22
 "The Right Time" (Jerry Herman) - 7:18
 "Have You Ever Had the Blues" (Harold Logan, Lloyd Price) - 6:43
 "The Midnight Sun Will Never Set" (Dorcas Cochran, Quincy Jones, Henri Salvador) - 6:55
 "Next Time You See Me" (Earl Forest, William G. Harvey) - 5:07
 "All Night Long" (Curtis Reginald Lewis) - 6:40

Personnel
Freddie Roach - organ
Joe Henderson - tenor saxophone
Eddie Wright - guitar
Clarence Johnston - drums

References

Blue Note Records albums
Freddie Roach (organist) albums
1964 albums
Albums recorded at Van Gelder Studio
Albums produced by Alfred Lion